Felipe Anselmo Viciano (born 6 January 1986 in Santa Bárbara d'Oeste), commonly known as Pio  is a Brazilian football player, currently plays for Corinthians Alagoano.

MFK Ružomberok
On 5 February 2010, Felipe has signed contract for Slovak club MFK Ružomberok.

External links
Corinthians Alagoano Profile
MFK Ružomberok Profile

References

1986 births
Living people
People from Santa Bárbara d'Oeste
Association football midfielders
Brazilian footballers
Brazilian expatriate footballers
Rio Branco Football Club players
Esporte Clube Santo André players
Ituano FC players
SK Hlavice players
Bohemian Football League players
MFK Ružomberok players
Slovak Super Liga players
São Bernardo Futebol Clube players
Sport Club Corinthians Alagoano players
Clube de Regatas Brasil players
Expatriate footballers in the Czech Republic
Brazilian expatriates in the Czech Republic
Expatriate footballers in Slovakia
Brazilian expatriates in Slovakia
Footballers from São Paulo (state)